The Beau Brummels is the sixth studio album by the American rock band of the same name. Released in April 1975, the album features the work of all five original band members for the first time since the band's debut album, 1965's Introducing the Beau Brummels. The album peaked at number 180 on the U.S. Billboard 200 albums chart in 1975.

Background and release 
After 1968's Bradley's Barn album, the Beau Brummels, by which time were a duo consisting of lead singer Sal Valentino and guitarist-songwriter Ron Elliott, split. 
Valentino recorded a few solo singles for Warner Bros. Records before forming a new band, Stoneground, which released three albums between 1971 and 1973. Elliott worked on tracks by The Everly Brothers, Van Dyke Parks, Randy Newman, Little Feat, and Pan. Elliott also released a solo album, The Candlestickmaker, in 1970.

In February 1974, Billboard magazine reported that the Beau Brummels re-formed in San Francisco. 
A resulting self-titled album containing new material was released in April 1975. One song, "You Tell Me Why" that was a U.S. top 40 hit for the band in 1965, 
was re-worked for this album. "Down To The Bottom" features guest Ronnie Montrose on lead guitar. The Beau Brummels reached number 180 on the Billboard 200 albums chart. 
Music critic Matthew Greenwald of Allmusic said the album was "one of the most successful 'reunion' projects of its time." 
However, in Valentino's view, "We hadn't performed at all, [the album] showed that we hadn't, and we were out of place."

Although this project started out as a full-fledged reunion of the original members, Ron Meagher left the group during production and before the photo shoot for the back of the album cover, hence only four members shown.

Track listing 
 "You Tell Me Why" (Elliott) — 3:15
 "First in Line" (Elliott, Engle) — 2:59
 "Wolf" (Elliott) — 2:23
 "Down to the Bottom" (Elliott, Engle) — 3:24
 "Tennessee Walker" (Elliott) — 3:14
 "Singing Cowboy" (Elliott) — 3:17
 "Goldrush" (Elliott, Engle) — 3:20
 "The Lonely Side" (Elliott) — 4:34
 "Gate of Hearts" (Elliott) — 3:00
 "Today By Day" (Elliott, Engle) — 2:36

Chart performance

Personnel 

 Nick DeCaro - string arrangements
 Ron Elliott - guitar, vocals
 Victor Feldman - percussion
 Mark T. Jordan - piano
 Mark Wilson Jordan - piano
 Donn Landee - engineer
 Dan Levitt - banjo, guitar

 Ron Meagher - bass, guitar, vocals
 Declan Mulligan - bass, guitar, vocals
 John Petersen - drums
 Ted Templeman - producer
 Sal Valentino - vocals
 Lenny Waronker - producer
 Ronnie Montrose - lead guitar on "Down To The Bottom"

References

External links 
 [ The Beau Brummels] at Allmusic

1975 albums
Warner Records albums
The Beau Brummels albums
Albums produced by Lenny Waronker
Albums produced by Ted Templeman